The 2013 Southwestern Athletic Conference baseball tournament was held at LaGrave Field in Fort Worth, Texas, from May 15 through 19, 2013.  First seed from the East  won their fifteenth tournament championship and earned the conference's automatic bid to the 2013 NCAA Division I baseball tournament.

The double elimination tournament features the top four teams from each division, leaving Mississippi Valley State and Grambling State out of the field.

Seeding and format
The top four finishers in each division were seeded one through four, with the top seed from each division facing the fourth seed from the opposite division in the first round, and so on.  The teams then played a two bracket, double-elimination tournament with a one-game final between the winners of each bracket.  Prairie View A&M claimed the third seed from the West over Texas Southern by tiebreaker.

Bracket

* - Indicates game ended after 7 innings due to mercy rule.

All-Tournament Team
The following players were named to the All-Tournament Team.

Most Valuable Player
Alexander Juday was named Tournament Most Valuable Player.  Juday was a pitcher for Jackson State who earned the victory in the championship game with a complete game and nine strikeouts, while yielding nine hits and two runs.

References

Southwestern Athletic Conference Baseball Tournament
Southwestern Athletic Conference baseball tournament
Tournament
Southwestern Athletic Conference baseball tournament
Baseball in the Dallas–Fort Worth metroplex